Jay Prabha Medanta Super Specialty Hospital is a multi-specialty medical institute based in Patna, Bihar, India. It is part of Medanta group of hospitals in India. It is located in Kankarbagh region of Patna. The construction was started on 5 May 2016, and was inaugurated on 18 September 2020, by Chief Minister of Bihar, Nitish Kumar. Its has capacity of 300 beds in 2021. It will gradually be  scaled up to 700.

As per CMO press release 25% of the beds of this hospital will be reserved for needy families and they will be charged as per Ayushman Bharat Pradhan Mantri Jan Arogya Yojana (PM-JAY).

References

External links

Hospitals in Patna
2020 establishments in Bihar
Hospitals established in 2020